Poncione del Vènn (or Poncione del Vanno) is a mountain of the Swiss Lepontine Alps, overlooking Lavertezzo in the canton of Ticino. It is located between the valleys of Verzasca and Leventina.

References

External links
 Poncione del Vènn on Hikr

Mountains of the Alps
Mountains of Switzerland
Mountains of Ticino
Lepontine Alps